Frederick Wells (1 June 1867 – 3 March 1926) was an English cricketer. Wells was a right-handed batsman who bowled right-arm medium. He was born at Clayton, Sussex.

Wells made his first-class debut for Sussex against the Marylebone Cricket Club at Lord's in 1891. He made a further first-class appearance in that season, against Gloucestershire at Clifton College Ground in the County Championship. Wells scored 7 runs in his two first-class matches. Wells later played minor counties cricket for Hertfordshire, making his debut for the county in the 1898 Minor Counties Championship against Staffordshire. He made seven further appearances for Hertfordshire in that season, the last of which came against Buckinghamshire.

He died at Stanstead Abbotts, Hertfordshire, on 3 March 1926. His father, George, also played first-class cricket.

References

External links
Frederick Wells at ESPNcricinfo
Frederick Wells at CricketArchive

1867 births
1926 deaths
People from Clayton, West Sussex
English cricketers
Sussex cricketers
Hertfordshire cricketers
People from East Hertfordshire District